Saida Rejeb (born 21 March 1994) is a Tunisian handball player. She plays for the club Olympique de Gafsa and on the Tunisian national team. She represented Tunisia at the 2013 World Women's Handball Championship in Serbia.

References

Tunisian female handball players
1994 births
Living people
Mediterranean Games competitors for Tunisia
Competitors at the 2022 Mediterranean Games
20th-century Tunisian women
21st-century Tunisian women